watchOS is the operating system of the Apple Watch, developed by Apple Inc. It is based on iOS, the operating system used by the iPhone, and has many similar features. It was released on April 24, 2015, along with the Apple Watch, the only device that runs watchOS. watchOS exposes an API called WatchKit for developer use.

The second version, watchOS 2, included support for native third-party apps and other improvements, and was released on September 21, 2015. The third version, watchOS 3, was released on September 13, 2016, to emphasize better performance and include new watch faces and stock apps. The fourth version, watchOS 4, was released on September 19, 2017. The fifth version, watchOS 5, was released on September 17, 2018, to add more third-party support and new workouts, along with the "Walkie-Talkie" feature. The sixth version, watchOS 6, was released on September 19, 2019. The seventh version, watchOS 7, was released on September 16, 2020, to support handwashing and sleep tracking. The eighth version, watchOS 8, was released on September 20, 2021, with updates in health monitoring, visuals, and apps. The ninth version, watchOS 9, was released on September 12, 2022.

Interface overview 
The home screen (rendered by and also known as "Carousel") is composed of circular application icons, which can be zoomed in and out with the Digital Crown and dragged and launched by touching the display.

Prior to watchOS 3, Glances provided fast access to a summarized view of the most popular native or third-party applications used on Apple Watch. The Glances view was opened with a swipe-up gesture from the watch face screen. With watchOS 3, Glances were replaced by a redesigned Control Center – much like the one in iOS. The friends menu, invoked with the side button, now acts as a dedicated dock for apps.

Different actions and options appear depending on whether the user taps or deep-presses, which an Apple Watch detects with its pressure-sensitive (Force Touch) Display. Force Touch was completely removed in watchOS 7, and all actions requiring the feature were moved to specific options in the Settings app or to long-press actions.

Supported health metrics 
Since its inception, watchOS has supported an increasing number and variety of health metrics for measurement and tracking. These include:
 heart rate
 maximal aerobic capacity, otherwise known as VO2 max (added in watchOS 4, enhanced in watchOS 7)
 electrocardiogram, otherwise known as EKG or ECG (added in watchOS 5.1.2)
 blood oxygen saturation, otherwise known as SpO2 (added in watchOS 7)
 menstrual cycle status (added in watchOS 6)
 sleep duration & respiratory rate tracking (added in watchOS 7)

HealthKit 

For several years, Apple has been developing its HealthKit product in an attempt to penetrate the lucrative healthcare and wellness industry, which many observers believe to hold a huge growth opportunity for Apple. This was confirmed by Jony Ive, Apple's former chief designer, in an interview. He said that health was a crucial element in the Apple Watch since the day of its inception and that the developmental trajectory of the hardware and the watchOS were geared towards health-based capabilities. Ive pointed out that one of the primary apps that shipped with the first watchOS allowed users to track and communicate as well as encourage them to move, exercise, and stand. He said:Many of us have our phones with us all the time, but they aren't connected to you. Imagine having something this powerful with you at all times, and what opportunities that might present to the user. The opportunity is phenomenal. Particularly when [you] don't understand just where we are today in terms of technology and capability, but where we are headed.One of the most recent updates to the watchOS included applications that not only keep users active but also diagnose illnesses. For example, there is the app called DeepHeart, a deep-learning network that can detect atrial fibrillation, hypertension, sleep apnea, and diabetes. It taps into the HealthKit platform to collect data, particularly those collected by the Apple Watch's heart sensor.

Version history

watchOS 1 
The first version of watchOS 1 was 1.0 and was based on iOS 8.2. The second version of watchOS 1 was 1.0.1 and was based on iOS 8.3.

watchOS 2

watchOS 3

watchOS 4

watchOS 5 
watchOS 5 was first shown to the public at the 2018 San Jose WWDC developer conference held on June 4, 2018 by Apple. It had an instant watch-to-watch Walkie-Talkie mode. With this release, Apple dropped support for the first generation Apple Watch. watchOS 5 was the first version of watchOS to bring 64-bit support.

watchOS 6 
Apple announced a new version of watchOS that would contain features, such as the App Store, a calculator with tip tools, an audiobooks app, noise level monitoring, and Apple's Voice Memos app, at WWDC 2019 held on 3 June 2019. It also enables special games that can only be played on the Watch interface. With this release, Apple dropped support for iPhone 5, 6 and 6 Plus. However, watchOS 6 has limited support on Apple Watch Series 1 and 2. watchOS 6.3 is the final release supported on the Apple Watch Series 1 and 2.

watchOS 7 
Apple announced watchOS 7 at the 2020 Worldwide Developers Conference on June 22, 2020. With watchOS 7, Apple dropped support for Apple Watch Series 1 and 2. However, watchOS 7 has limited support on Apple Watch Series 3.

watchOS 8 
Apple announced watchOS 8 at the 2021 Worldwide Developers Conference on June 7, 2021.  Apple Watch models supporting watchOS 7 can also support watchOS 8. However, like watchOS 7, watchOS 8 has limited support on Apple Watch Series 3. It is also the last version of watchOS to be supported on Apple Watch models with 32-bit processors.

watchOS 9 
Apple announced watchOS 9 at the 2022 Worldwide Developers Conference on June 6, 2022. With this release, Apple dropped support for Apple Watch Series 3, making it the first version of watchOS to run exclusively on Apple Watch models with 64-bit processors.

See also 
 tvOS
 macOS
 iOS
 Wear OS, Android competitor

References

External links 
  – official site
 Apple security content – for details about watchOS security updates
 About watchOS 9 Updates – Apple's official watchOS 9 release notes

IOS
Apple Inc. operating systems
2015 software
Apple Watch